Franco Indovina (1932 – 4 May 1972) was an Italian film director and screenwriter. In 1959, he was assistant of Michelangelo Antonioni on the set of L'Avventura. He directed six films between 1965 and 1971.

He died when Alitalia Flight 112 crashed on approach to Palermo. His 1967 film Lo scatenato was shown as part of a retrospective on Italian comedy at the 67th Venice International Film Festival.

The actress Lorenza Indovina, born in 1966, is his daughter.

Filmography
 Menage all'italiana (1965)
 I tre volti (1965)
 Lo scatenato (1967)
 Le plus vieux métier du monde (1967)
 Giochi particolari (1970)
 Tre nel mille (1971)

References

External links

1932 births
1972 deaths
Italian film directors
20th-century Italian screenwriters
Italian male screenwriters
Victims of aviation accidents or incidents in Italy
Victims of aviation accidents or incidents in 1972
20th-century Italian male writers